Alexander (Alex) Ryvchin (born 18 July 1983) is an Australian author, advocate, media commentator, and lawyer.

Biography
He was born in Kiev, Ukraine and migrated to Australia as a refugee. He practised law at Mallesons Stephen Jaques in Sydney and Herbert Smith in London before serving as a spokesman for the Zionist Federation UK and being awarded an Israel Research Fellowship. His writing on the Arab–Israeli conflict and Jewish history has been published in numerous international newspapers, including The Australian, The Sydney Morning Herald, The Guardian, The National Post, and The Jerusalem Post. Ryvchin is a regular columnist for The Spectator.

Author
Ryvchin is the author of two books on Israel. His debut book, The Anti-Israel Agenda - inside the political war on the Jewish State (Gefen Publishing House, 2017), is a collaborative work with other prominent thinkers on the Israel-Palestinian conflict including Alan Dershowitz, Colonel Richard Kemp, Hillel Neuer and Professor Alan Johnson. It was lauded by former Arkansas Governor Mike Huckabee as "the most important book on Israel since Alan Dershowitz's "The Case for Israel".

In May 2019, Ryvchin announced the upcoming release of his second book, titled "Zionism - The Concise History".

Critic
Ryvchin is an outspoken critic of the anti-Israel movement referring to its activists as "self-righteous westerners" with "pretensions to heroism" who seek "redemption" by "slaying the Zionist beast".

He has been a staunch critic of Palestinian terrorism, corruption and rejection of a negotiated end to the conflict with Israel.

He has spoken publicly of his love for Australia and his support for multiculturalism and integration which Ryvchin argues requires that "we accept the duty to uphold the freedoms granted to us and to protect the values underpinning our society – values such as democracy, tolerance, mutual respect."

Television guest
He is a frequent guest on US, Israeli and Australia media. In May 2013, Ryvchin was appointed Director of Public Affairs at the Executive Council of Australian Jewry and was promoted to co-Chief Executive Officer in 2018, becoming one of the youngest professional leaders in the Jewish world.

Personal life
He currently resides in Sydney with his wife and daughters.

References 

1983 births
Australian Jews
Australian journalists
Living people
Ukrainian emigrants to Australia
Australian people of Ukrainian-Jewish descent